Engebretson is a surname. Notable people with the surname include:

Burger M. Engebretson (1896–1981), American politician
George Engebretson (1890–1961), American politician
Heather Engebretson (born 1990), American lyric soprano
Julius M. Engebretson (1864–1937), American politician and businessman
Mark Engebretson (born 1964), American saxophonist and composer